Hardîne, sometimes written Ḩardīn, is a village in Batroun District, North Lebanon Governorate, Lebanon. Notable structures include the Temple of Mercury, severely damaged by an earthquake, and several Christian churches and monasteries.

Notable people from Hardîne
Joseph Assaf, Australian ethnic marketing executive
Nimatullah Kassab (1808-1858), named a saint by the Roman Catholic church
Benjamin of Hardin, Maronite muqaddam who fought and died in the Kisrawan campaigns (1292–1305)

References

External links

Batroun District